Alresford Pond is a  biological Site of Special Scientific Interest in New Alresford in Hampshire.

This large lake was created by Godfrey de Lucy, who was Bishop of Winchester between 1189 and 1204, to provide a reservoir of water to make the River Itchen navigable. The lake has a rich aquatic plant community and large populations of breeding wetland birds, such as reed warblers and sedge warblers.

References

 
Sites of Special Scientific Interest in Hampshire